The 2011 Auto One V8 Ute Racing Series was a motor racing series for Ford Falcon and Holden utilities (or "utes") built and conforming to V8 Utes series regulations and those holding valid licences to compete as issued by series organisers Spherix and Australian V8 Ute Racing Pty. Ltd. It was the eleventh running of a national racing series for V8 Utes in Australia. The series began on 17 March 2011 at the Adelaide Street Circuit and ended on 2 December at the Homebush Street Circuit after 8 rounds.

The series was won by Kiwi Chris Pither, over former V8 Supercar driver David Sieders and in third place was Ryal Harris.

Teams and drivers
The following drivers competed in the 2011 V8 Utes series.

Race calendar
The 2011 V8 Utes Series will consist of eight rounds, all of which will be held on the support programme of the V8 Supercar Championship Series.

Series Points

References

External links
 Official series website
 2011 Official Pointscore
 2011 Racing Results Archive

V8 Utes
V8 Ute Racing Series